Musab Habkor (born 24 January 1999) is a Saudi Arabian professional footballer who plays as a midfielder for Abha.

Career
Habkor began his career at the Al-Amjad before moving to the youth team of Abha. He was promoted to the first team in 2019. He made his debut on 2 November 2019 in the 4–0 loss to Al-Nassr. On 25 October 2020, Habkor joined Najran on loan. On 27 August 2021, Habkor joined Al-Kawkab.

References

External links 
 

1999 births
Living people
Saudi Arabian footballers
Al-Amjad FC players
Abha Club players
Najran SC players
Al-Kawkab FC players
Saudi Professional League players
Saudi First Division League players
Association football midfielders